is a Japanese actress. She won the award for best actress at the Buenos Aires International Festival of Independent Cinema 2001 for the film Firefly (Hotaru) and the award for best supporting actress at the 28th Yokohama Film Festival for Strawberry Shortcakes''.

Filmography

Film

Television

References

1975 births
Living people
Japanese actresses
Place of birth missing (living people)